Thomas Henry Bolton (February 1841 – 24 September 1916) was an English solicitor and a Liberal politician who sat in the House of Commons between 1885 and 1895.

Bolton was born at Clerkenwell, the son of  Thomas Bolton. He was admitted a solicitor 1869 and became a partner in the firm of Bolton & Mote, of Gray's Inn, London.

Bolton was elected at the 1885 general election as Member of Parliament (MP) for St Pancras North, but lost the seat in the 1886 general election. He regained the seat in a by election in 1890 after his successor succeeded to the peerage, and was re-elected in 1892, but did not stand again at the 1895 general election.

Bolton lived at South Binns, Heathfield, Essex, and died at the age of 75.

Bolton married Elizabeth Ann Wegg in 1861.

References

External links 

1841 births
1916 deaths
Liberal Party (UK) MPs for English constituencies
UK MPs 1885–1886
UK MPs 1886–1892
UK MPs 1892–1895
Liberal Unionist Party MPs for English constituencies